Manuel Antonio Caballero Agüero (5 December 1931 – 12 December 2010) was a notable Venezuelan historian, journalist, best-selling author and professor of contemporary Venezuelan History at the Central University of Venezuela.

Biography 
Caballero was born in Barquisimeto, studied history at the Central University of Venezuela and obtained a PhD at University College London. With the publication of his PhD dissertation he became the first Venezuelan author to be published by Cambridge University Press. In 1989 he was invited to teach at Universitá degli Studi di Napoli in Italy. He received the National Award on Journalism (Premio Nacional de Periodismo) and the National History Award (Premio Nacional de Historia, 1994) and in 2005 he was elected as a member of the Academia Nacional de la Historia (or National Academy of History of Venezuela). He wrote regularly for Venezuelan newspapers El Nacional, El Diario de Caracas and most recently El Universal. Despite his past as a left-wing thinker and political activist, in particular against president Rómulo Betancourt, in his latter years he became one of the most vocal and vehement critics of president Hugo Chávez and his administration. He revised his perspective on President Betancourt in a biography written in 2004.

On 2010, he underwent a prostate surgery that triggered a series of infections unresponsive to antibiotics, further complicated by diabetes. He died on 12 December 2010.

Works
La Pasión de Comprender: ensayos de historia (y de) política (1983)
EL Orgullo de Leer (1988)
 Las Elecciones Presidenciales: ¿la última  o la primera? (1989)
 Gómez, El Tirano Liberal: vida y muerte del siglo XIX (1993)
 De la "Pequeña Venecia" a la "Gran Venezuela": una historia de cinco siglos (1997)
 Contra el golpe, la dictadura militar y la guerra civil (1998)
La Crisis de la Venezuela Contemporánea 1903–1992 (1998)
 La gestación de Hugo Chávez: 40 años de luces y sombras en la democracia venezolana (2000)
 Latin America and the Comintern, 1919–1943 (2002)
 Rómulo Betancourt, Político de Nación (2004)
 El Desorden de los Refugiados (2004)
 Dramatis Personae: doce ensayos biográficos (2004)
 ¿Por qué no soy bolivariano? (2006)
 La Peste Militar (2007)
 Contra la abolición de la historia (2008)
 Polémicas y otras formas de escritura (2008)
 No más de una cuartilla (2009)
 Historia de los venezolanos en el siglo XX (2010)

External links
Selected Essays 
Profile at the Academia Nacional de Historia 
Biblioteca Manuel Caballero 
"El Poder Popular es una ficción" interview by the newspaper El Universal 
Interview to Manuel Caballero about his book "Historia de los venezolanos en el siglo XX" – Lo afirmativo venezolano 

1931 births
Alumni of University College London
Writers from Caracas
Venezuelan male writers
20th-century Venezuelan historians
Central University of Venezuela alumni
Academic staff of the Central University of Venezuela
2010 deaths
21st-century Venezuelan historians